Reform is the fifth studio album by Chinese singer Jane Zhang, released on June 1, 2011 by Universal Music China.

Track listing

References 

2011 albums
Jane Zhang albums